Manfred Böcker (14 March 1940 – 16 January 2023) was a German politician and teacher. A member of the Social Democratic Party, he served in the Landtag of North Rhine-Westphalia from 1980 to 2005.

Böcker died in Augustdorf on 16 January 2023, at the age of 82.

References

1940 births
2023 deaths
Social Democratic Party of Germany politicians
Members of the Landtag of North Rhine-Westphalia
Recipients of the Cross of the Order of Merit of the Federal Republic of Germany
Politicians from Essen